CHCM-FM is an FM radio station located in Marystown, Newfoundland and Labrador, Canada broadcasting at 88.3 MHz. Owned by Stingray Group, CHCM first went on the air on May 23, 1962. It is an affiliate of VOCM. CHCM was originally broadcast on 560 AM before moving to 740 in 1990.

In September 2016, CHCM and CKVO in Clarenville cancelled their remaining local programming and now simulcast VOCM in St. John's full-time.

On July 4, 2019, Stingray received CRTC approval to convert CHCM to 88.3 MHz with an effective radiated power of 59,300 watts (non-directional antenna with an effective height of the antenna above average terrain of 186.1 metres).

References

External links 
 VOCM
 
 

Hcm
Hcm
Hcm